The Bobby Jones Expressway is a roadway in the U.S. state of Georgia that is named for golfer Bobby Jones. It follows:

Georgia State Route 232's easternmost  (from its intersection with SR 104 and Old Evans Road in Martinez to its eastern terminus in Augusta
Interstate 520 in Georgia's entire portion within the state of Georgia, completely within Augusta.

References

Streets and parkways in the Augusta metropolitan area
Transportation in Columbia County, Georgia
Transportation in Richmond County, Georgia
Expressways in the United States
Freeways in the United States
Interstate 20
Transportation in Augusta, Georgia